Charles Jewett may refer to:
 Charles Coffin Jewett (1816–1868), librarian
 Charles W. Jewett (Connecticut politician) (1913–2000), Lieutenant Governor of Connecticut
 Charles W. Jewett (Indiana politician) (1884–1961), Mayor of Indianapolis